The Santorini cable car connects the port with the town of Thera in Santorini island in Greece. It was constructed as a donation of the “Loula & Evangelos Nomikos Foundation”. The cable car, technically a pulsed Gondola lift, was built by Doppelmayr, has a capacity of 1,200 people per hour (600 per hour in each direction). The journey takes 3 minutes.

The cable car enables visitors arriving by ship to ascent the cliffs easily and quickly. Each car carries six passengers.

References

External links

Buildings and structures in Santorini
Cable cars in Greece